Kupferberg is a municipality in the district of Kulmbach, in Bavaria, Germany.

Kupferberg may also refer to:
 The German name for Miedzianka, Lower Silesian Voivodeship, Poland
 The German name for Měděnec, Ústí nad Labem Region, Czech Republic
 The German name for Miedziana, Opole Voivodeship, Poland
 The Kupferberg Center for the Arts, at Queens College, City University of New York

People
 Herbert Kupferberg (1918–2001), American music critic and editor
 Tuli Kupferberg (1923–2010), American counterculture poet, author and publisher
 Dr. Eliot Kupferberg, a character from the television series The Sopranos

See also
 Kuperberg, a surname
 Kupperberg, a surname